Cottonwood Heights is a city located in Salt Lake County, Utah, the United States, along the east bench of the Salt Lake Valley. It lies south of the cities of Holladay and Murray, east of Midvale, and north of Sandy within the Salt Lake City, Utah Metropolitan Statistical Area. Following a successful incorporation referendum in May 2004, the city was incorporated on January 14, 2005. Cottonwood Heights had been a Census-designated place (CDP) before incorporation. The population as of the 2010 census was 33,433. This is a significant increase over the CDP's 2000 census count of 27,569.

The corporate offices of Dyno Nobel, the defunct Fusion-io, Extra Space Storage, Breeze Airways, and JetBlue are located in the city.

In 2007, Money magazine rated Cottonwood Heights at #100 on their Best Places to Live list.

Geography
As the city's name suggests, its geography is dominated by a high ridge separating the valleys of the Big and Little Cottonwood Creeks. At the eastern edge of the city, these valleys narrow into the Big and Little Cottonwood Canyons within the Wasatch Mountains, respectively; this is reflected by the city's official nickname, "City between the canyons". The ridge is covered in suburban housing, but most commercial development has been restricted to the lower-lying areas north of the ridge (along Fort Union Boulevard, in Fort Union itself, and near Big Cottonwood Creek and the "Old Mill" in the northeast corner of the city).

State Route 190 and State Route 210 run near the eastern edge of the city and provide access to the canyons; they are the only state routes that enter the city. Interstate 215 runs along the northern border of the city, and State Route 152 touches the city at a point. The city is building a multi-use trail along the full length of Big Cottonwood Creek within its borders.

Cottonwood Heights is in the Canyons School District; Brighton High School is the only public high school in the city. Butler Middle school is the only middle school within city limits.

According to the United States Census Bureau, the CDP had a total area of 6.8 square miles (17.6 km), all land.

Demographics

According to estimates from the Kem C. Gardner Policy Institute of the University of Utah, as of 2015, there were 34,234 people in Cottonwood Heights. The racial makeup of the county was 86.57% non-Hispanic White, 0.81% Black, 0.60% Native American, 4.51% Asian, 0.88% Pacific Islander, and 2.34% from two or more races. 4.29% of the population were Hispanic or Latino of any race.

Local media
 The Cottonwood/Holladay City Journal (tabloid style newspaper), covering local government, schools, sports, and features.

Police services

On January 8, 2008, the Cottonwood Heights City Council voted to create its own police department and withdraw from its current contract with the Salt Lake County Sheriff's Department.

Notable people
 Jackson Barton, American football tackle
 Cody Barton, American football linebacker
Greg Curtis, former Speaker of the Utah House of Representatives
Tristan Gale, Olympic gold medalist
Gordon Hudson, American football tight end
Bryan Kehl, American football linebacker
Trevor Lewis, hockey player
Reno Mahe, American football running back
Post Malone, American musician
David Neeleman, former CEO of JetBlue Airways
Boyd K. Packer, Latter-Day Saint leader
Mark Shurtleff, former Utah Attorney General
Scott Johnson, Cartoonist
William R. Walker, Canadian-American Mormon leader

See also

 List of cities and towns in Utah

References

External links

 

 
Cities in Utah
Cities in Salt Lake County, Utah
Former census-designated places in Utah
Salt Lake City metropolitan area
Populated places established in 2005